Typesafe may refer to:
Type safety, a concept in computer science, in which a programming language discourages or prevents type errors
Typesafe Inc. (renamed to Lightbend), a company founded by Martin Odersky and the creators of the Scala programming language and Akka middleware